Rio Preto may refer to:

Inhabited places in Brazil
Dores do Rio Preto, Espírito Santo
Rio Preto, Minas Gerais
Rio Preto da Eva, Amazonas
Rio Preto National Forest, Espírito Santo
Rio Preto State Park, Minas Gerais
São José do Rio Preto, São Paulo
São José do Vale do Rio Preto, Rio de Janeiro

Sports
Rio Preto Esporte Clube, a Brazilian football (soccer) club

See also
Preto River (disambiguation)
Rio Pretão, a football (soccer) stadium
Río Prieto (disambiguation)